The Udet U 1 was the first of a line of small, low-powered, low wing, cantilever monoplanes built in Germany in the early 1920s.

Design and development

In the summer of 1921, a new aviation company was formed using the WWI German flying ace Ernst Udet's name. William Pohl from Milwaukee, Hans Henry Herrmann and Erich Scheuermann joined the company to fund the aircraft before postwar treaty restrictions were lifted on aircraft production, with the intent of building an inexpensive aircraft for the American market. The builders produced and flew the U 1 five months before the formation of the Udet Flugzeubau GmbH company.

The design was a low wing, cantilever monoplane in an era dominated by biplanes. The U 1 was a single-seater, as the air-cooled,  Haacke HFM-2 flat-twin did not have enough power for more than one person. An enlarged-bore version of the engine, the  HFM-2a was used in the two seat U-2.

The U-2, like its predecessor, had a one-piece wing with a high aspect ratio of 9. In plan it was trapezoidal out to angled tips and had light dihedral. It was built around twin wooden spars; ahead of the leading spar the wing was plywood-covered, forming a torsion-resistant D-box. Ailerons, which filled about 40% of the trailing edge, reached out to the tips.

Behind the engine in its aluminium cowling the fuselage was structurally rectangular in section apart from raised upper decking and was ply-covered. Pilot and passenger sat in tandem in a single, open cockpit, with the pilot in front and over the centre of the wing. It had a conventional, rather angular tail, with a fin of greater area than the rudder, though this reached down to the keel; the tailplane, mounted on top of the fuselage, was also large compared with the elevators.

The U 2 had a conventional undercarriage, with pairs of outward-reaching V-struts from the lower fuselage joined at their vertices by a transverse member, to which the single axle was held by shock absorbing rubber rings.

With a passenger the U-2 was slower than the U 1 and clearly under-powered, so the last three variants, the U 4, U 6 and U 10, were fitted with more powerful Siemens-Halske radial engines.

Operational history

The Siemens-Halske-powered U 6 and U 10 variants sold best, with about 16 built. Flown by Udet, the longer span U 10 was the fastest aircraft in the Coupe d'Italie des Avions de Tourisme held in November 1924, though criticized for its high landing speed. In 1925 a U 10 came first in the under- class of the Deutschen Rundflug.

Variants

Data from German Aviation 1919-1945

Udet U 1
Single seat prototype with  Haacke HFM-2 flat-twin. One only.
Udet U 2
Two seat production variant with  Haacke HFM-2a flat-twin. Four built.
Udet U 4 
 Siemens-Halske Sh 4 five cylinder radial powered. One built.
Udet U 6 
 Siemens-Halske Sh 5 radial powered with revised, more rounded wing plan and tail surfaces. "Bathtub" cockpit replaced with separate single cockpits. Five built.
Udet U 10
 Siemens-Halske Sh 4 five cylinder radial powered.  wingspan. Eleven built.
Udet U 10a
Floatplane variant with  Siemens-Halske Sh 11. One only, possibly a conversion.

Aircraft on display 

 German Museum of Technology, Berlin: Udet U 10, D-452

Specifications (U 2)

References

External links
 Udet U.1
 U 10 German

Udet aircraft
Low-wing aircraft
Single-engined tractor aircraft
Aircraft first flown in 1922
1920s German sport aircraft